Neruda is a Czech surname (meaning "acrimonious"). Notable people with this name include:

 Franz Xaver Neruda ((1843–1915), Czech-Danish cellist, son of Josef Neruda
 Freedom Neruda (born 1956), Ivorian journalist
 Jan Neruda (1834–1891), Czech journalist, writer and poet
 Johann Baptist Georg Neruda (c. 1707–1780), Czech composer
 Josef Neruda (1807–1875), Czech organist, great-grandson of Johann Baptist Georg Neruda
 Maria Neruda (1838–1911), Czech-Swedish violinist, daughter of Josef Neruda
 Pablo Neruda (1904–1973), Chilean poet, writer and socialist politician, Nobel laureate for Literature
 Wilma Neruda, Lady Hallé (1838–1911), Czech violinist, daughter of Josef Neruda

See also 
 Neruda (disambiguation)

Czech-language surnames

cs:Neruda
de:Neruda
es:Neruda (desambiguación)
eo:Neruda
fr:Neruda
it:Neruda
he:נרודה
lv:Neruda
pt:Neruda (desambiguação)
sk:Neruda
tr:Neruda
zh:聂鲁达